The following is an incomplete list of association football clubs based on the island of Mayotte.

A
AS Neige de Malamani
AS Sada
ASC Abeilles
ASC Kawéni

F
FC Labattoir
FC Mtsapéré
FCO de Tsingoni
Foudre 2000 de Dzoumogné

M
Miracle du Sud  (Bouéni)

R
Rosador de Passamainty

U
UCS Sada
US Ouangani

Mayotte
 
Football clubs

Football clubs